Hanahai may refer to:
East Hanahai, Botswana
West Hanahai, Botswana